The 2011–12 FC Karpaty Lviv season was the 49th season in club history.

Review and events
On 8 June 2011 FC Karpaty gathered at club's base for medical inspection after vacations. The club went to two-week training camp in Austrian Alps on 19 June 2011

Friendly matches

Pre-season

Mid-season

Winter break

Premier League

League table

Results summary

Matches

Ukrainian Cup

UEFA Europa League

Qualifying rounds

Squad information

Squad and statistics

Squad, appearances and goals

|-
|colspan="16"|Players away from the club on loan:

|-
|colspan="16"|Players featured for Karpaty but left before the end of the season:

|}

Goalscorers

Disciplinary record

Transfers

In

Out

Managerial changes

Sources

Karpaty Lviv
FC Karpaty Lviv seasons
Karpaty Lviv